
Year 602 (DCII) was a common year starting on Monday (link will display the full calendar) of the Julian calendar. The denomination 602 for this year has been used since the early medieval period, when the Anno Domini calendar era became the prevalent method in Europe for naming years.

Events 
 By place 

 Byzantine Empire 
 Emperor Maurice succeeds in winning over the Avars to Byzantine rule, but his campaigns against the Avars, Lombards, Persians and Slavs drain the imperial treasury, requiring an increase in taxes. He orders the troops to stay for winter beyond the Danube, but a mutiny breaks out under Phocas. He brings the Byzantine forces back over the Danube and marches on to Constantinople.  
 November 27 – A civil war breaks out and Phocas enters Constantinople. Maurice is captured trying to escape; he is forced to witness the slaughter of his five sons and all his supporters, and is then executed (beheaded) after a 20-year reign. His wife, Constantina, and his three daughters are spared, and sent to a monastery. Phocas is proclaimed the new emperor of the Byzantine Empire.
 Byzantine–Persian War: King Khosrau II launches an offensive against Constantinople, to avenge Maurice's death, his "friend and father", and tries to reconquer Byzantine territory. Narses, governor of Upper Mesopotamia, rebels against Phocas at the city of Edessa and requests aid from the Persians. Khosrau sends an expeditionary force to Armenia and crosses the Euphrates.

 Europe 
 Spring – Witteric is appointed commander-in-chief of the Visigoth army, and receives orders from King Liuva II to expel the Byzantines from Hispania.

 Persia 
 Khosrau II annexes the Lakhmid Kingdom (Southern Iraq), and puts king Nu'man III to death.

 Asia 
 Third Chinese domination of Vietnam: The Early Lý dynasty ends; Hậu Lý Nam Đế, last ruler of Vąn Xuân (North Vietnam), abdicates the throne and becomes a vassal of the Sui dynasty.
602 Surb Karapet Monastery earthquake.  It affected the Surb Karapet Monastery, located in the district of Taron.

 By topic 

 Religion 
 Augustine of Canterbury meets with the Welsh bishops at Aust near Chepstow. He accuses them of not adopting the Roman Christian way of dating Easter, and persuades them to accept the teaching of baptism (according to the Roman Rite).

Births 
 Adaloald, king of the Lombards (d. 626)
 Li Chunfeng, Chinese mathematician and  historian (d. 670)
 Liu Rengui, general and official of the Tang dynasty (d. 685) 
 Muawiyah I, founder of the Umayyad Caliphate (d. 680)
 Theodore of Tarsus, archbishop of Canterbury (d. 690)
 Xuanzang, Chinese Buddhist monk and traveler (d. 664)
 Zhiyan, Chinese (Buddhist) patriarch (d. 668)
 Muawiyah bin Abi-Sufyan, Caliph of Syria (d. 680)

Deaths 
 September 10 – Dugu Qieluo, empress of the Chinese Sui dynasty (b. 544)
 November 27 – Maurice, Byzantine emperor (b. 539)
 Nu'man III, king of the Lakhmids
 Ariulf, Lombard duke of Spoleto
 Bayan I, ruler (khagan) of the Avars
 Comentiolus, Byzantine general (magister militum)
 Peter, Byzantine general (curopalates)
 Theodosius, Byzantine co-emperor
 Tiberius, Byzantine prince
 Lady Xian, Chinese general (b. 512)

References

Sources